Caelopyginae is a harvestmen sub-family in the family Gonyleptidae, containing the following genera:
 Ampheres Koch, 1839 – includes Prosodreana Giltay, 1928, Coelopygulus Roewer, 1931, Zalonius Mello-Leitão, 1936, Metampheroides Mello-Leitão, 1941 and Pizaius Soares, 1942
 Arthrodes Koch, 1839
 Caelopygus Koch, 1839 – includes Liarthrodes Mello-Leitão, 1922 and Heterarthrodes Mello-Leitão, 1935
 Garatiba Mello-Leitão, 1940
 Metampheres Roewer, 1913
 Metarthrodes Roewer, 1913 – includes Exochobunus Mello-Leitão, 1931, Heterampheres Mello-Leitão, 1935, Varzellinia Mello-Leitão, 1942 and Kapichaba Mello-Leitão, 1942
 Pristocnemis Koch, 1839 – includes Stenoprostygnus Piza, 1940
 Proampheres Roewer, 1913
 Thereza Roewer, 1943

References 

Harvestmen
Arthropod subfamilies